Kingsley may refer to:

People
Kingsley (given name)
Kingsley (surname)

Places

Australia
Kingsley, Western Australia

Canada
Rural Municipality of Kingsley No. 124, Saskatchewan

England
Kingsley, Cheshire
Kingsley, Hampshire
Kingsley, Staffordshire

United States
Kingsley, Iowa
Kingsley, Kentucky
Kingsley, Michigan
Kingsley, Oregon
Kingsley, Pennsylvania
Kingsley Corners, Wisconsin
Kingsley Plantation, Florida
Kingsley Township, Forest County, Pennsylvania

Other uses
Kingsley College, Melbourne, Australia, a school of theology
Kingsley Hall, London, England
Kingsley (mascot), the mascot for Partick Thistle F.C.
The Kingsley Tufts Poetry Award
Perrey and Kingsley, pioneers in electronic music
Kingsley Royal, mascot for Reading F.C.
Kingsley Field, airport located in Southern Oregon
Kingsley's Adventure, video game

See also
 Kinsley (disambiguation)